Tom Loftin Johnson (July 18, 1854 – April 10, 1911) was an American industrialist, Georgist politician, and important figure of the Progressive Era and a pioneer in urban political and social reform. He was a U.S. Representative from 1891 to 1895 and Mayor of Cleveland for four terms from 1901 to 1909. Johnson was one of the most well known, vocal, and dedicated admirers of Henry George's views on political economy and anti-monopoly reform.

Early life and business career
Tom Johnson was born in Georgetown, Kentucky on July 18, 1854. Johnson's father, a wealthy cotton planter with lands in Kentucky and Arkansas, served in the Confederate Army in the Civil War. The war ruined the family financially, and they were forced to move to several locations in the South in search of work. By age 11, Johnson was selling newspapers on the railroads in Staunton, Virginia, and providing a substantial part of the family's support. He worked all through his youth, and never had more than one complete year of formal education.

Johnson's break came through an old family connection with the industrial du Pont dynasty. In 1869, the brothers A.V. and Bidermann du Pont gave him a clerk's job on the street railway business they had acquired in Louisville. Johnson rose rapidly in the business, and discovered a taste for the mechanical side of it. He patented several inventions, including an improved type of streetcar rail, and the glass-sided farebox still used on many buses today.

By 1876, thanks partly to royalties from his farebox, Johnson was able to strike out on his own, purchasing a controlling share in the street railways of Indianapolis. In the 1880s and 90s he expanded his interests to lines in Cleveland, St. Louis, Brooklyn and Detroit, and also entered the steel business, building mills in Lorain, Ohio, and Johnstown, Pennsylvania, to provide rails for streetcar tracks. He moved to Cleveland in 1883 and soon afterwards bought a mansion on the "Millionaire's Row" of Euclid Avenue.

Politics and philosophy
Two chance events helped spark Johnson's interest in politics and social questions, and convert him from a conventional business tycoon to a radical reformer. The first was reading, on the suggestion of a train conductor, Henry George's Social Problems, in which the political philosopher expounded his belief that poverty and misery were a result of society's newly created wealth becoming locked up in increasing land values, and advocating a Single Tax on land in place of wastefully taxing the productive activity of capital and labor.

Johnson then became consumed by the arguments George made in Progress and Poverty; he read and reread it, finally requesting assistance from his business associates to find flaws in George's reasoning.  Johnson took the book to his lawyer and said, "I must get out of the business, or prove that this book is wrong.  Here, Russell, is a retainer of five hundred dollars [$13,000 in 2015]. I want you to read this book and give me your honest opinion on it, as you would on a legal question. Treat this retainer as you would a fee." Johnson then sought out George in New York at the first possible opportunity, and the two became close friends and political collaborators. Johnson abandoned his business of rail monopoly and spent much of his fortune promoting the ideas of Henry George.

The second event was being present to witness the terrible Johnstown Flood of 1889. Johnson and his business partner Arthur Moxham organized the immediate relief activities in the stricken, leaderless city. Interpreting the events through a Georgist lens, the experience left him with a deep resentment of what he called 'Privilege'. The disaster had been caused by the improper maintenance of a dam holding a private recreational lake, owned by Henry Clay Frick and other Pittsburgh industrialists, who escaped all responsibility for it. More than that, to Johnson, the flood exemplified the inadequacy of charity and weak "remedial measures" to solve society's problems.

When Johnson went into politics, "he went in on the explicit advice of Henry George." Johnson mounted an unsuccessful campaign for the U.S. House of Representatives in 1888, and then won the seat in 1890, serving two terms. He promoted free trade and the Single Tax idea, and was a useful moderate on the divisive currency question.

The issue of privilege gradually made Johnson reconsider his own business career. "Traction" (streetcar) companies depended on route franchises granted by city councils; political connections and payoffs gave favored companies the upper hand. In an era when most everyone rode the cars, the stakes were high, and battles for franchises were often the hidden issue behind cities' factional strife.

Johnson knew the game intimately; in his speeches declaiming against the evils of the streetcar barons, he always pointed out that he could speak with authority, because he was one of them himself. In Cleveland, he came into conflict early with Mark Hanna, the powerful local businessman who by 1894 would be the leading power broker of the Republican Party, the man credited with putting fellow Ohioan William McKinley in the White House.

Johnson's streetcar fights with Hanna and his allies make a colorful part of Cleveland political folklore. In a time when companies with a monopoly of transport on a route were able to charge five cents for a ride, he made the 'three-cent fare' a cornerstone of his populist philosophy, and later he would come out in favor of complete public ownership. Through the 1890s Johnson gradually divested himself of most of his transit and steel holdings, to devote himself entirely to the politics of reform. In 1901, pressed on by influential citizens and a public petition, he decided to run for mayor of Cleveland.

His campaign electrified the city. Johnson liked to rent large circus tents and set them up on neighborhood lots, attracting big crowds for whom he would deliver a powerful speech, banter cheerfully with hecklers, and finish with a stereopticon show with a political moral. On April 1, 1901, he was elected with 54% of the vote.

Mayor of Cleveland
Johnson's entry into office would prove just as dramatic as his campaign. One of the campaign issues had been a valuable piece of city-owned downtown lakefront property, which outgoing mayor John H. Farley and the council had agreed to hand over to the railroads without compensation. Johnson obtained a court injunction to stop the giveaway, but it was set to expire three days after the election. Taking advantage of a legal technicality to get the new mayor sworn in early, Johnson's men staged a surprise takeover of City Hall and saved the land for the city (today this land, with later landfill additions, holds Cleveland Browns Stadium, the Rock and Roll Hall of Fame and the Great Lakes Science Center).

Johnson's four terms in office transformed Cleveland. Securing a bipartisan reform majority in the city council allowed him to effect major changes in every department of city government. Some of his policies were true innovations, while others mirrored those of the two other notable Progressive Midwestern mayors of the era, Hazen S. Pingree of Detroit and Samuel 'Golden Rule' Jones of Toledo.

In the judgement of one urban historian, "Johnson was a superb municipal technician. He grasped not only the ethics but the mathematics of government." The new administration paved hundreds of miles of streets and expanded the city's park system, building a large number of playgrounds, ball fields and other facilities. To popular acclaim, the mayor tore up all the 'Keep off the Grass' signs in the city parks, a symbol of his belief in changing parklands' role from passive to active recreation.

Rubbish collection, then in private hands, had been a big campaign issue. Johnson eliminated the haulers' franchises and replace them with a municipal department; he hired back all the men who had lost their jobs, and demonstrated how a public service could provide better performance at lower cost. In keeping with the administration's focus on public health, a street cleaning force was started, and the city's Water Department was depoliticized and vastly improved.  Public bathhouses were built in the poorest neighborhoods; some of these impressive buildings survive today. Johnson also began work on the monumental West Side Market, one of Cleveland's best-known landmarks.

To improve housing conditions, the administration established the country's first comprehensive modern building code in 1904; the code became a model for many U.S. cities. As Director of Charities and Correction, Johnson appointed his own pastor, Harris R. Cooley. Under Cooley, the city purchased a huge tract of farmland in Warrensville Township, where a new City Workhouse was established on humanitarian principles, along with cottages for the indigent elderly and a sanatorium.

Johnson was fortunate in finding talented men to staff his administration. Police Chief Fred Kohler, a stubborn, incorruptible martinet, gained national renown for cleaning up and professionalizing the force, and clamping down on vice. While laws were strictly enforced, Kohler made sure his men went easy on young first offenders and honest citizens in trouble. City Solicitor Newton D. Baker led the successful fight for 'Home Rule', working to give Cleveland a charter that would allow it greater independence from state oversight; Baker's efforts would pay off in 1912, when he wrote the amendment to the state constitution that brought full Home Rule to all Ohio's cities. Both Baker and Kohler would become mayors in their own right, continuing Johnson's policies, and Baker later served as Secretary of War under Woodrow Wilson.

The physical symbol of Johnson's revolution in government is Cleveland's civic center, a spacious park surrounded by public buildings, called simply 'The Mall'. The origins of the 'Group Plan' went back to a competition held by the Cleveland Architectural Club in 1895, but it was Johnson who pushed the appropriations through, and brought in a team headed by Daniel Burnham, the nation's leading planner, to design it. In an idealistic age, civic centers like this were consciously meant to be an architectural expression of democratic ideals. Burnham, who had created the Court of Honor at the World's Columbian Exposition in Chicago and designed the restoration of the National Mall in Washington, D.C., brought the City Beautiful movement of the era to Cleveland; work on the Mall and its ensemble of public buildings continued well into the 1930s.

Throughout the decade, the transit wars continued unabated. By 1903, the Hanna interests, the lines formerly run by Johnson, and others were consolidated into the Cleveland Electric Railway Company, a private near-monopoly opposed only by the Johnson-supported Municipal Traction Company, offering a three-cent fare. Seven years of conflict exhausted both firms and forced them into receivership. In 1910 voters approved a compromise plan called the 'Tayler Grant' under which Cleveland Electric Railway would lease the lines from the city and be assured of a 6% return. Though the new arrangement worked well for decades, it was seen as a defeat for Johnson.

Johnson took up the cause of municipal ownership not only in streetcars, but electric power, to bring down rates by offering competition to the monopoly private utility. He founded the Municipal Light and Power Company, and though political opposition kept him from expanding it, the next Progressive mayor, Newton D. Baker, built a new plant that opened in 1914 as the biggest public utility in the U.S. "Muny Light" (now Cleveland Public Power) brought important savings on the city's own electric bills, and those of residents fortunate enough to have access to the service, while it forced the private competitor to keep its own rates low.

In a booming city that for decades had been predominantly Republican, fiscally frugal and business-oriented, Johnson's policies made him an extremely divisive figure. As his associate Frederic C. Howe put it, it was a "Ten Years' War", and people were either strongly for the mayor or strongly against him. In winning his four terms, Johnson depended heavily on the vote from ethnic neighborhoods on the West Side, where his three-cent fare streetcars operated. In the middle and upper-class sections of the East Side, opponents railed against policies they called expensive and "socialistic", pointing out that after only five years Johnson had nearly doubled the city's debt.

The tenacious opposition of the Republicans and the business interests kept most of Johnson's big plans tied up in legal battles. By 1909, Clevelanders were becoming increasingly weary of reform and endless political fights, and Johnson was defeated for re-election by a relatively obscure Republican, Herman C. Baehr. Having ruined his health and dissipated his considerable fortune in the cause of reform, Johnson lived just long enough to dictate his autobiography,  My Story. He died in Cleveland in 1911, and was buried next to Henry George in Brooklyn's Green-Wood Cemetery.

Legacy

The revolution in government Johnson effected in Cleveland made him a national figure. The noted muckraking journalist Lincoln Steffens called him "the best Mayor of the best-governed city in the United States."

Johnson's vision of a more honest, efficient and humane city government inspired Cleveland politics for decades to come. The years that followed his death were perhaps the most creative period in the city's history, in which it perfected excellent library and school systems, while completing the Group Plan's public buildings on the Mall and the ensemble of educational and cultural institutions at University Circle. The city was frequently cited as a model in many fields of government efficiency and social reform.

Though Cleveland's elites would never come around to sharing Johnson's political ideas, his example did much to build a sense of civic duty and cooperative spirit among them. Typical of these was Frederick C. Goff, president of the city's largest bank, who once said "I am more concerned that the Cleveland Trust Company shall fulfill its obligations to the community than make money for the stockholders". Goff was instrumental in founding the Cleveland Foundation, America's first community foundation.

A 1993 survey of historians, political scientists and urban experts conducted by Melvin G. Holli of the University of Illinois at Chicago saw Johnson ranked as the second-best American big-city mayor to serve between the years 1820 and 1993. Only Fiorello La Guardia of New York City placed higher.

Family
Johnson's brother Albert was also prominent in the streetcar business. In 1889, he became the financial backer and organizer of the Players' League, a baseball major league begun by the players themselves, in order to get a fair share of profits.

A cousin, Henry V. Johnson, was Mayor of Denver, and Henry's son, the like-named Tom Loftin Johnson, was a noted artist.

See also
Cleveland Traction Wars

References

Notes

Sources and further reading

 Bremner, Robert H. "The Civic Revival in Ohio: Reformed Businessman: Tom L. Johnson." American Journal of Economics and Sociology 8.3 (1949): 299-309.
 Briggs, Robert L. "The Progressive Era in Cleveland, Ohio: Tom L. Johnson's Administration, 1901-1909" (PhD dissertation, University of Chicago; Proquest Dissertations Publishing, 1962. T-09573).

 DeMatteo, Arthur E. "The Downfall of a Progressive: Mayor Tom L. Johnson and the Cleveland Streetcar Strike of 1908." Ohio History 104 (1995): 24-41.

Johannesen, Eric, Cleveland Architecture 1876–1976. Western Reserve Historical Society, 1979.
Lorenz, Carl, Tom L. Johnson, Mayor of Cleveland. A.S.  Barnes, 1911 online
 Lough, Alexandra W. "Tom L. Johnson and Cleveland Traction Wars, 1901–1909." American Journal of Economics and Sociology 75.1 (2016): 149-192.

 Megery, Michael. "Ideological Origins of a Radical Democrat: The Early Political Thought of Tom L. Johnson, 1888–1895." Middle West Review 6.1 (2019): 37-61.
 Miggins, Edward M. "A City of Uplifting Influences: From Sweet Charity to Modern Social Welfare and Philanthropy." In The Birth of Modern Cleveland, 1865-1930, edited by Thomas F. Campbell and Edward M. Miggins, (Western Reserve Historical Society, 1988) pp 141-71. 

 Murdock, Eugene C. Tom Johnson of Cleveland (Wright State University Press, 1994), a standard scholarly biography.
 Rose, William Ganson. Cleveland, The Making of a City. World Publishing, 1950. online
 Suit, William Wilson. "Tom Loftin Johnson, businessman reformer' (PhD dissertation, Kent State University ProQuest Dissertations Publishing,  1988. 8827177).

Van Tassel, David and Grabowski, John J., editors, The Encyclopedia Of Cleveland History . Case Western Reserve University and the Western Reserve Historical Society.
 Warner, Hoyt Landon. Progressivism in Ohio, 1897-1917 (Ohio State University Press, 1964).

 Whitehair, Andrew L., "Tom L. Johnson’s Tax School: the Fight For Democracy And Control of Cleveland’s Tax Machinery" (2020). (ETD Archive. 1190. online

Primary sources 
Howe, Frederic C., Confessions of a Reformer. Scribner 1925; reprint Kent State University Press, 1988.
Johnson, Tom L.. My Story. B. W. Huebsch, 1911; reprint Kent State University Press 1993. Text also online at the  Cleveland Memory Project.

External links

 
Tom L. Johnson materials at teachingcleveland.org
Text of Henry George's Social Problems at the Internet Archive
The history of Cleveland Public Power

Mayors of Cleveland
Burials at Green-Wood Cemetery
People from Georgetown, Kentucky
1854 births
1911 deaths
19th-century American politicians
Democratic Party members of the United States House of Representatives from Ohio
Georgist politicians